"Evidence" is a song by American Christian singer-songwriter Josh Baldwin that was released via Bethel Music on June 12, 2020, as the lead single from his fourth studio album of the same name, Evidence (2020). Baldwin co-wrote the song with Ed Cash and Ethan Hulse.

"Evidence" became Baldwin's second entry on Billboard's US Hot Christian Songs chart, peaking at number seven.

Background
On June 1, 2020, Bethel Music had announced via Daily Play MPE that "Evidence" would be Josh Baldwin's next single, with the song slated to impact Christian radio on July 3, 2020. On June 12, 2020, Bethel Music released "Evidence" as the lead single to his forthcoming release with the label. On September 16, 2020, Bethel Music announced that Evidence will be Baldwin's upcoming release, being slated for October 2, 2020.

Writing and development
Baldwin shared the story behind the song in a video uploaded to YouTube. Baldwin said the following about the song:

Composition

Commercial performance
"Evidence" made its debut at No. 41 on the US Hot Christian Songs chart dated August 1, 2021, nearly eight weeks after the song's release. Billboard reported that "Evidence" broke through the top ten of the Hot Christian Songs chart, debuting at No. 10 because of substantial gains in radio airplay, the feat being achieved after spending 25 weeks on the chart.

Music videos
The lyric video of "Evidence" was published on June 12, 2020, on Bethel Music's YouTube channel. The acoustic music video of the song, performed by Josh Baldwin, recorded at Whiskeytown Lake in California was published on June 15, 2020, on Bethel Music's YouTube channel.

Track listing

Charts

Weekly charts

Year-end charts

Release history

Live version featuring Dante Bowe

On February 24, 2021, Josh Baldwin released the acoustic performance video of "Evidence" featuring Dante Bowe. Bethel Music then released the re-imagined version of "Evidence" featuring on April 2, 2021.

Background
Bethel Music shared the story behind this version, saying:

Music video
The music video of "Evidence (Live)" was published on February 24, 2021, on Bethel Music's YouTube channel.

Track listing

Release history

References

External links
  on PraiseCharts
 

2020 singles
2020 songs
Contemporary Christian songs
Songs written by Ethan Hulse
Songs written by Ed Cash